Georges-Henri Colombe Reazel (born 9 April 1998) is a French rugby union player. His position is tighthead prop and he currently plays for La Rochelle in the Top 14.

He was called for the first time in the France national rugby team in October 2020 for the 2020 Six Nations Championship.

References

External links
Racing 92 profile

1998 births
Living people
People from Nanterre
French rugby union players
Racing 92 players
USON Nevers players
Stade Rochelais players
Rugby union props
Sportspeople from Hauts-de-Seine